Flubber is a 1997 American science-fiction comedy film directed by Les Mayfield (who had previously directed another John Hughes scripted remake, Miracle on 34th Street) and written by Hughes and Bill Walsh. A remake of The Absent-Minded Professor (1961), the film was produced by Walt Disney Pictures and stars Robin Williams, Marcia Gay Harden, Christopher McDonald, Ted Levine, Raymond J. Barry, Wil Wheaton, and Clancy Brown with Jodi Benson providing a voice. The film grossed $178 million worldwide and received negative reviews from critics. In selected theaters, the Pepper Ann episode "Old Best Friend" was featured before the film.

Plot
Professor Philip Brainard, of Medfield College, is a mad scientist who is developing a new energy source. He does this to raise enough money to save the college from closure. His preoccupation with his research distracts him from his fiancée, Sara Jean Reynolds, who is the president of the college; he has already missed two wedding dates as a result of this, much to Sara's anger. On the day of the third attempted wedding, Brainard is approached by his former partner Wilson Croft, who has profited from ideas he has stolen from the chemist and now desires to steal Sara from Brainard and make her his wife. Brainard takes this declaration as a joke.

Before Brainard can make it to the wedding, his latest experiment shows quick progress, forcing him to miss this latest wedding date. The resulting substance created from the experiment is a sentient green goo with enormous amounts of elasticity and kinetic energy. It increases in speed as it bounces and proves to be difficult to control, wreaking havoc on the neighborhood before the professor finally manages to capture it. Weebo, Brainard's hovering robot assistant, classifies the substance as "flying rubber", leading Brainard to christen it "Flubber". Brainard continues to work on Flubber into the early morning, looking to stabilize the Flubber's movement as opposed to stimulation. Brainard's incorrectly set watch alarm goes off at 6:30 am, and Weebo informs him that he has missed the wedding. Brainard goes to Sara's office and unsuccessfully attempts to explain the situation to her, after which he becomes all the more determined to prove the Flubber's worth and win her back.

Meanwhile, Medfield College sponsor Chester Hoenicker (who is first seen in a newspaper article as the one threatening to foreclose the college) is disappointed that Brainard has failed his son Bennett in chemistry class. That night, Hoenicker sends his security guards Smith and Wesson to Brainard's house in an attempt to persuade Brainard into giving Bennett a better grade. However, Brainard is too busy experimenting with the Flubber to even notice them and unknowingly knocks them unconscious with a Flubber-coated golf ball and bowling ball. Later, Brainard uses Flubber to give his vintage Ford Thunderbird flight, and during a test run, he discovers Wilson flirting with Sara (making a bet that she will buy him dinner if Medfield wins, or join him for a weekend in the mountains if they lose). Afterward, Weebo attempts to confess her love of Brainard, only to be shrugged off as a computer. In response, she secretly creates a holographic human version of herself named Sylvia in hopes of winning him over. Before Weebo can kiss Brainard in this form as he sleeps, Brainard awakens with another idea for Flubber. He enters the vacant basketball arena and tests the effects of Flubber on a basketball and his shoes. Right before the game, he gives Flubber-padded shoes to the unskilled Medfield basketball team to increase their abilities and beat the Rutland team. Back in Brainard's home, looking to have some fun, Weebo unleashes Flubber from his case, allowing him to dance around the house and cause general mayhem.

After the close but successful basketball game, Brainard's attempt to win Sara back into his favor fails. Upon returning home, Weebo records Brainard as he releases his emotional baggage, saying his absent-mindedness is due to his love of Sara. After this, he resignedly goes to bed after admitting Sara isn't right for him after all. Weebo, feeling guilty about failing to remind him about his wedding, shows the footage to Sara, who then reconciles with Brainard. Brainard demonstrates Flubber's abilities to Sara and they discuss how it can be used for profit. However, Hoenicker discovers Flubber's existence, and after failing to convince Brainard and Sara to sell it to him, he summons Smith and Wesson to raid Brainard's house and steal Flubber. Weebo attempts to fend off the henchmen, only to be struck down by Wesson with a baseball bat. Brainard and Sara return to find the home a wreck and find Weber (Brainard's house-robot) cleaning up, Flubber stolen, and Weebo destroyed. Later, Brainard discovers that Weebo had downloaded backup data of herself onto his computer in the event of her destruction, as well as a video recording of Weebo's hologram professing her love for him.

Brainard and Sara confront Hoenicker and attempt to save Flubber, under the guise of accepting Hoenicker's offer. While there, they discover that Wilson is allied with the millionaire who wanted to sell it for a profit. Brainard and Sara then reveal their ruse and unleash Flubber, starting a battle between the villains and them. In the end, Brainard and Sara defeat Wilson, Bennett Hoenicker, Chester, and his henchmen, retrieve Flubber, raise enough money to save the college, and finally have a successful wedding, along with Flubber and the "daughter" of Weebo, called Weebette. The film ends with the family heading to Hawaii in the Thunderbird, flying at an altitude of 30,000 feet, with Weebette insisting on not sharing a hotel room with Flubber.

Cast
 Robin Williams as Professor Philip Brainard
 Marcia Gay Harden as Dr. Sara Jean Reynolds
 Christopher McDonald as Wilson Croft 
 Jodi Benson as Weebo
 Leslie Stefanson as Weebo's holographic human form, Sylvia
 Raymond J. Barry as Chester Hoenicker
 Clancy Brown as Smith
 Ted Levine as Wesson
 Wil Wheaton as Bennett Hoenicker
 Edie McClurg as Martha George
 Sam Lloyd as Coach Willy Barker
 Scott Michael Campbell as Dale Jepner
 Bob Sarlatte as Rutland coach
 Scott Martin Gershin as Flubber
 Julie Morrison as Weebette
 Corrie Scott as Basketball Player #2
 Jane Sanguinetti as Female Life Model (uncredited)

Additionally, Nancy Olson makes an uncredited appearance as a Ford Company Secretary. Olson previously portrayed Betsy Carlisle in The Absent-Minded Professor and its sequel, Son of Flubber.

Production
Filming began in 1996 in San Francisco on Treasure Island in Building 180 and Hangar 3. Sets constructed there included the basketball court, a duplicate of the Professor's house, where some exterior and all interior shots were produced, a separate set portraying the basement of the house, and Hoenicker's library. Many exterior shots of Brainard's house were shot in San Jose at a home that was temporarily modified, including the addition of an observatory on the roof.

Sara Jean's office, Hoenicker's living room, and most exterior campus shots were produced at a private girls' high school on the San Francisco peninsula. The exterior shot of the Rutland gym was shot at Stanford. Some scenes were filmed on campus at San Jose State University in Washington Square Hall during production in 1997. The shot of the Professor and Sara Jean floating through the clouds in the Thunderbird was filmed at the former Mare Island Naval facility in Vallejo, California. Other scenes were filmed at the University of the Pacific, Stockton.

Gag homages
Many gags are embellishments from the 1961 film; John Hughes rewrote the original Bill Walsh screenplay (based on Samuel W. Taylor's short story A Situation of Gravity, originally published in the May 22, 1943, issue of Liberty magazine). Though Walsh died in 1975, he received posthumous credit for this script.

Release
Flubber made $93 million in the United States and $85 million in other countries for a total of $178 million.

Flubber was first released on VHS and Laserdisc on April 21, 1998. The DVD was released on June 16 the same year, with the film's original theatrical trailer as a bonus feature.

Reception

Box office 
Flubber grossed $93 million in the United States and Canada, and $85 million in other territories, for a worldwide total of $178 million.

The film opened alongside Alien Resurrection, and was projected to gross around $32.5 million in its five-day Thanksgiving opening weekend. It went on to debut to $26.7 million (and a total of $36.4 million over the five), topping the box office. It fell 58% to $11.3 million in its second weekend, remaining in first.

Critical response 
On Rotten Tomatoes the film holds an approval rating of 23% based on 35 reviews, with an average rating of 4/10. The website's critical consensus reads: "With its overactive focus on special effects and tiresome slapstick, Flubber squanders the immense talent of its cast and crew". Metacritic assigned the film a weighted average score of 37 out of 100, based on 19 critics, indicating "generally unfavorable reviews". Audiences polled by CinemaScore gave the film an average grade of "B+" on an A+ to F scale.

References

External links

 
 
 
 
 
 
 Flubber Film Location - Professor's home

1997 films
1990s science fiction comedy films
American children's comedy films
American robot films
American science fiction comedy films
American slapstick comedy films
Disney film remakes
1990s English-language films
Films about educators
Films directed by Les Mayfield
Films produced by John Hughes (filmmaker)
Films produced by Michael Barnathan
Films scored by Danny Elfman
Films set in Indiana
Films shot in San Jose, California
Films with screenplays by John Hughes (filmmaker)
Flying cars in fiction
Mad scientist films
Medfield College films
Walt Disney Pictures films
1997 comedy films
The Absent-Minded Professor
1990s American films